FUNREDES (acronym in Spanish for Fundación-Redes-y-Desarrollo, or  Networks-and-Development-Foundation) was a non-governmental organization based in the Dominican Republic and dedicated to the dissemination of Information and Communication Technologies (ICT) in the developing countries, especially in Latin America and the Caribbean. 

It did so in collaboration with international organizations, NGOs, the States, administrations, and public or private institutions, with the objective of contributing to regional development and integration.

Since the early 1990s, FUNREDES's position has been that: "Internet for Development" is not about plugging and playing, chatting and surfing, getting information abroad, converging to one language, one culture and one market. On the contrary, it is more about empowering people and communities, collaborating and social networking, producing local content, and facilitating a diversity of languages, cultures and opinions. 

Its goal is communication above technology not the contrary.''" 

A pioneer ICT4D organization since 1988, FUNREDES was a member of APC since 2006. 

The main area of activities of FUNREDES included:
- Creating national networks for research and civil society
- Linguistic diversity in the Internet
- Social impact of the Internet
- Virtual communities
- Digital literacy and information ethics

FUNREDES ended its existence as an NGO in May 2017, however, the program named Observatory of Linguistic and Cultural Diversity on the Internet is maintained and gained independent formal existence in 2021, maintaining on line also the Funredes site.

External links
Funredes.org, with links to site in Spanish, English and French
Observatory of Linguistic and Cultural Diversity on the Internet, in Spanish, English and French

Organizations based in the Dominican Republic
Information technology organizations based in the Caribbean